The Belbo is a river of southern Piedmont, Italy. It is a right-side tributary of the Tanaro.

Geography 
The Belbo rises in the Langhe, on the borders between Piedmont and Liguria in the hills of Montezemolo.
After flowing through the Piedmontese provinces of Cuneo, Asti and Alessandria, the river joins the Tanaro from the right at Villa del Foro, in the comune of Alessandria.

References

Other projects

Langhe
Monferrato
Rivers of the Province of Cuneo
Rivers of the Province of Asti
Rivers of the Province of Alessandria
Rivers of Italy